The Dauphin railway station is located in Dauphin, Manitoba, Canada. The station is served by Via Rail's Winnipeg – Churchill train.

The station was built in 1912 by the Canadian Northern Railway to a design by architect John Schofield. The station was designated a Heritage Railway Station of Canada in 1990. The station was designated as a Manitoba historic site on 27 January 1998, and is marked with a Manitoba Heritage Council commemorative plaque.

Dauphin Railway Museum
The station is home to the Dauphin Railway Museum, which features railroad artifacts and displays about rail service in the region, the Canadian Northern Railway and later Canadian National Railway. Exhibits include a caboose, roundhouse and turntable, lamps, tools, photos, a motor car (jigger), an HO scale model rail, and a geographic display of steam/diesel era (1954–1965).

See also

 List of designated heritage railway stations of Canada

References

External links 
Via Rail Station Information
Provincial Historic Site Information
Dauphin Rail Museum - City of Dauphin

Dauphin, Manitoba
Via Rail stations in Manitoba
Railway stations in Canada opened in 1912
Designated Heritage Railway Stations in Manitoba
Canadian Northern Railway stations
1912 establishments in Manitoba
Provincial Heritage Sites of Manitoba
Canadian Register of Historic Places in Manitoba